Alexey Steblev (born October 2, 1972) is a Russian cellist, composer, conductor, and entrepreneur.

Biography 
Alexey Steblev finished Gnessin School of Music, then studied cello at the Moscow Conservatory. Together with other members of Talan Quartet (later known as Moscow Quartet) he was a student of Valentin Berlinsky. While still in school, Alexey Steblev won the first grand prix at the international contest Concertino Praga. From 1992 to 2003 he was a cellist in Moscow Quartet. With Moscow Quartet he became a winner of international contests in Vienna and Saint-Petersburg, played with Alexander Rudin, Konstantin Lifschitz, Corina Belcea, Norbert Brainin and many others and made three recordings including the complete quartets by Alexander Taneyev on London label Olympia Records and Alexander Gretchaninov on the Swiss label Pan Classics.

In 2002, Alexey Steblev became a soloist of the chamber orchestra Moscow Virtuosi. from 2002 to 2005 he also was the art director of "Pir O.G.I.", a Moscow network of cafes. In 2006, in coauthorship with Petr Klimov, he wrote music to the film "Svyaz" by Avdotya Smirnova, and in 2008 and 2011, to two more films by the director: Fathers and Sons (2008) and Two Days (2011).

In 2008, together with Yulia Igonina, Elena Kharitonova and Mikhail Rudoy Alexey Steblev founds the New Russian Quartet. In 2011 he leaves Moscow Virtuosi.

Alexey Steblev worked in the venture capital industry: frrm 2011 to 2013 he was a vice president of business development in Enhanced Spectrometry Inc. and Terasense Inc. He also worked in the venture capital department of Troika Ventures. In 2014-2015 Steblev worked as a manager of distribution network development in Artec Europe.

Since 2015, Alexey has taught quartet in State Classical Academy Maimonides. He is also a conductor of the academy's orchestra. In the same year the label Melodiya released the New Russian Quartet's album Cinemaphonia that includes renowned quartets used for various motion pictures soundtracks and Alexey's own piece "Moviemusic for String Quartet".

Compositions
Moviemusic for String Quartet

Film soundtracks
 Svyaz (2006) (dir. Avdotya Smirnova)
 Fathers and Sons (2008) (dir. Avdotya Smirnova)
 Two Days (2011) (dir. Avdotya Smirnova)
 Kniga Malgil (2013, short film, dir. Tanya Vigel)
 Suprematism'' (2014, short film, dir. Nikolay Sheptulin)

Discography 
 1995 - A.S.Taneev: All string quartets (Talan quartet), Olympia records, UK
 1998 — Music for December (music by Anton Batagov for the film Music for December by dir. Ivan Dykhovichny)
 2001 — Gretchaninov: String Quartets 2 & 4 (with Moscow Quartet), PanClassics, Switzerland
 2001 — Strana glukhih (music for the film Country of the Deaf by dir. Valery Todorovsky) (with the ensemble 4'33'' of Alexey Aygi).
 2009 — Brahms and Reger Clarinet Quintets ( with New Russian Quartet) and Valeriy Gorokholinsky
 2015 — Cinemaphonia ( with New Russian Quartet), Melodiya
 2016 — Sergey Akhunov. Chamber Works ( with New Russian Quartet)
 2017 - Quintet+. Chamber music live from Moscow Conservatory hall (with New Russian Quartet, Lyudmila Berlinskaya)

References

Links 
 official webpage of the New Russian Quartet
 Cinemaphonia in Apple Music

1972 births
Living people
Russian musicians
Russian cellists
Russian film score composers